Niko Tuhkanen is a Finnish professional ice hockey defenceman who is currently a free agent having last played for GKS Katowice in the Polska Hokej Liga.

Tuhkanen played in the Liiga (formerly SM-liiga) for plays for Lahti Pelicans, Espoo Blues, Tappara and KooKoo.

References

External links

1988 births
Living people
IF Björklöven players
Espoo Blues players
Finnish ice hockey defencemen
GKS Katowice (ice hockey) players
KooKoo players
Lahti Pelicans players
Lempäälän Kisa players
HK Neman Grodno players
Peliitat Heinola players
Sportspeople from Lahti
Tappara players
TuTo players
Vaasan Sport players